The Steubenville Stubs was the predominant name of a minor league baseball team that sparsely played in Steubenville, Ohio between 1887 and 1913.  The team was first formed in 1887 as a member of the Ohio State League, before disbanding on June 29 of that year. A second Stubs team played in 1895 as a member of the Interstate League, however that team also proved to be short-lived. The club moved to Akron, Ohio on May 10, 1895 to become the Akron Akrons and then to Lima, Ohio on May 19, 1895 to become the Lima Farmers.

The third incarnation of the Stubs began in 1905 as the city fielded a team for the Ohio–Pennsylvania League, named the Steubenville Factory Men. A year later the club moved to the Pennsylvania–Ohio–Maryland League and took up the Stubs moniker. In 1907 the Stubs ended the season with a 69-33 for the league title. After skipping the 1908 season, the Stubs returned for the 1909 and 1911 seasons. The team disbanded on August 20, 1911. In 1912 the Stubs moved to Follansbee, West Virginia for the second half of the 1912 Ohio–Pennsylvania League season, as the Steubenville-Follansbee Stubs. The club went 14–15 to fourth of four teams in a tight race in the second half, before the league folded on August 6, 1912. The Fairmont Fairies were declared the league champion when the Stubs were unable to field a team for the playoffs.

A final Stubs team played in the Interstate League in 1913, before disbanding for the final time.

Year-by-year record

Baseball teams established in 1887
Baseball teams disestablished in 1913
1887 establishments in Ohio
1913 disestablishments in Ohio
Defunct minor league baseball teams
Steubenville, Ohio
Defunct baseball teams in Ohio
Ohio State League teams
Ohio-Pennsylvania League teams